The 3rd Destroyer Squadron  was a naval unit of the Royal Navy from 1952 to 2001.

Overview
After World War II, the Royal Navy reverted to its previous layout and command structure in July 1951 the 3rd Destroyer Flotilla of the Mediterranean Fleet was disbanded. In February 1952 a new 3rd Destroyer Squadron was activated. The Admiralty controlled global deployment until 1964, when that department was abolished and replaced by the Navy Department, Ministry of Defence. Geographic commands usually consisted of fleets, squadrons, flotillas, and single ships. In 1954, major re-structuring of the navy was undertaken, leading to downsizing of administrative requirements.  Warships were then rotated between the various fleets and stations. From 1954 until 1971, many naval commands were abolished or amalgamated into larger commands. In November 1971, nearly all British naval forces were brought under the command of a single fleet at Northwood Headquarters. under the control of Commander-in-Chief Fleet. In 2012 that post was abolished and replaced by the Fleet Commander, who administered the fleet from Navy Command Headquarters in Portsmouth, Hampshire.

Organizational changes
Note: Command structure organizational changes took place within Royal Navy post war period the term Flotilla was previously applied to a tactical unit until 1951 which led to the creation of three specific Flag Officers, Flotillas responsible for the Eastern, Home and Mediterranean fleets the existing destroyer flotillas were re-organized now as administrative squadrons.

Operational history
Deployments included:
 Assigned to Mediterranean Fleet - (1952-1956) 
 Assigned to Home Fleet - (1956-1958) 
 Assigned to First Flotilla, Fleet (1980- 1995)
 Assigned to the Fleet - (1996-2002)
Notes:Revived as 3rd Far East Destroyer Squadron, (January 1967-January 1972)

Composition
Included: 
, Mediterranean Fleet 1952
3rd Destroyer Squadron
 HMS Saintes (Leader)
 HMS Armada
 HMS Gravelines
 HMS Vigo
, Mediterranean Fleet 1953
3rd Destroyer Squadron
 HMS Saintes (Leader)
 HMS Armada
 HMS Gravelines
 HMS Vigo - (July 1953)
  - (July 1953)
 HMS St. Kitts - (November 1953)
, Mediterranean Fleet 1954
3rd Destroyer Squadron
 HMS Saintes (Leader)
 
 HMS St. Kitts
, Mediterranean Fleet 1954-1956
3rd Destroyer Squadron
 HMS Saintes (Leader)
 HMS Armada (Leader) 
 HMS Barfleur
 HMS St. Kitts
, Home Fleet 1956
3rd Destroyer Squadron
 HMS Armada (Leader) 
 HMS Barfleur
 HMS St. Kitts
, Home Fleet 1957
3rd Destroyer Squadron
 HMS Armada (Leader) 
 HMS Barfleur
 HMS St. Kitts
, Home Fleet 1958
3rd Destroyer Squadron
 HMS Armada (Leader) 
 HMS Barfleur
 
, First Flotilla, Fleet 1980-1995
3rd Destroyer Squadron, Portsmouth & Rosyth 
  (Leader)
  (Leader)
  (Leader)   
  - (Leader)
    
 
 
   
            
 
, The Fleet 1996
3rd Destroyer Squadron
 HMS Liverpool - (Leader)
 HMS Birmingham - (December 1999)
 HMS Glasgow
 HMS Nottingham
 HMS York
 HMS Edinburgh
, The Fleet 1997
3rd Destroyer Squadron
 HMS Liverpool - (Leader)
 HMS Birmingham - (December 1999)
 HMS Glasgow
 HMS Nottingham
 HMS York
 HMS Edinburgh
, The Fleet 1998
3rd Destroyer Squadron
 HMS Liverpool - (Leader)
 HMS Birmingham - (December 1999)
 HMS Glasgow
 HMS Nottingham
 HMS York
 HMS Edinburgh
, The Fleet 1999
3rd Destroyer Squadron
 HMS Liverpool - (Leader)
 HMS Birmingham - (December 1999)
 HMS Glasgow
 HMS Nottingham
 HMS York
 HMS Edinburgh
, The Fleet 2000
3rd Destroyer Squadron
 HMS Edinburgh - (Leader)
 HMS Glasgow
 HMS Liverpool - (Lead ship)
 HMS Nottingham
 HMS York
, The Fleet 2001-2002
3rd Destroyer Squadron
 HMS Edinburgh - (Leader)
 HMS Glasgow
 HMS Liverpool
 HMS Nottingham
 HMS York

Squadron commander
Included:

Of note, for the last few months of its existence, Command of the 3rd Destroyer Squadron was combined with that of the 5th Destroyer Squadron, as the "Commander of the 3rd and 5th Destroyer Squadrons" prior to abolition of both squadrons and the incorporation of all the Type 42 destroyers within the newly established Portsmouth Flotilla.

See also
 List of squadrons and flotillas of the Royal Navy

Footnotes

Sources
 Mackie. Colin (2017). British Armed Forces from 1860. Senior Royal Navy Appointments from 1865: Gulabin. http://www.gulabin.com/.
 Smith. Gordon and Watson, Graham. Dr. (2015) The Royal Navy, post 1945. Royal Navy Organisation and Ship Deployments 1947–2013. http://www.naval-history.net.

External links

Destroyer squadrons of the Royal Navy
Military units and formations of the Royal Navy in World War II